XLS or xls may refer to:
X and or /..&..\ x
 Microsoft Excel file format, a spreadsheet file format
 Cadillac XLS, a prototype Cadillac concept car
 Exelis Inc. (NYSE symbol), a global aerospace, defense, information and services company
 Lusitanian language (ISO 639-3 code), an Indo-European Paleohispanic language
 Midwest Questar XLS, an American ultralight aircraft design
 Saint-Louis Airport (IATA airport code), near Saint-Louis, Senegal